Rhinogobio is a genus of cyprinid fish endemic to China.

Species
There are currently five recognized species in this genus:
 Rhinogobio cylindricus Günther, 1888
 Rhinogobio hunanensis J. H. Tang, 1980
 Rhinogobio nasutus (Kessler, 1876)
 Rhinogobio typus Bleeker, 1871
 Rhinogobio ventralis Sauvage & Dabry de Thiersant, 1874

References

 
Cyprinidae genera
Cyprinid fish of Asia
Freshwater fish of China
Endemic fauna of China
Taxa named by Pieter Bleeker